Amin Ramazanov (born 20 January 2003) is an Azerbaijani footballer who currently plays as a goalkeeper for Qarabağ in the Azerbaijan Premier League.

Career

Club
On 28 February 2022, Ramazanov made his debut for Qarabağ in a 0–0 draw against Keşla in the Azerbaijan Premier League.

References

External links
 

2003 births
Living people
Association football goalkeepers
Azerbaijani footballers
Qarabağ FK players
Azerbaijan Premier League players